The 1696 Jacobite assassination plot was an unsuccessful attempt led by George Barclay to ambush and kill William III and II of England, Scotland and Ireland in early 1696.

Background
One of a series of plots by Jacobites to reverse the Glorious Revolution of 1688–1689, the plot of 1696 had been preceded by the "Ailesbury plot" of 1691–1692. Strictly the "Fenwick plot" of 1695 is distinct from the assassination plot of 1696. The successor was the proposed French invasion of Scotland of 1708.

Robert Charnock had served under John Parker in the Jacobite cavalry at the Battle of the Boyne in 1690. In 1694 he was put in command of forces raised in the London area by Parker, for a potential Jacobite rising against William III and Mary II. Parker also drew in George Porter and Sir William Parkyns. He left the country in the middle of 1694. By then Charnock was discussing a plan to kidnap William III and take him to France. Mixed messages from James II confused the issue, and nothing had been done by April 1695, when William left the country.

Sir John Fenwick, 3rd Baronet, was one of the inner circle who advised James on English affairs. The death of Queen Mary at the end of 1694 revived their interest in direct action in England, and finance from France arrived by April 1695. Fenwick, however, was opposed to the schemes proposed by Charnock and his group. Meeting in May with Sir John Friend and others, he sent Charnock to France to move a plan for a massive invasion, instead. In June Fenwick was involved in Jacobite rioting and was arrested. Sir George Barclay was sent to act as his deputy in commanding forces supposed to co-ordinate with an invasion force under the Duke of Berwick. Barclay assessed the plan as hopeless, shunned Fenwick, and went back to the original idea of "kidnapping" William, certainly a euphemism for an assassination.

Plan

The plot was based on William III's habitual movements, on returning from hunting. On the south bank of the River Thames, at Kew, he would take a ferry that would bring him to the north bank, on a lane that ran from Turnham Green to Brentford (at this period these places were not built up, and lay west of the London conurbation).
Barclay's plan depended on surprising William in his coach, and his armed escort. It was intended to use three parties of armed men, one to capture the king, and the others to deal with his guards. A point was chosen on the lane which was narrow enough so that the royal coach and six horses would not be able to manoeuvre.

The plot was prepared and its armed men were ready to act on 15 February and 22 February 1696. One party was under the command of Ambrose Rookwood.

Detection of the plot
William Trumbull, who was Secretary of State for the Northern Department at the time, heard about the plotting beginning in August 1695. He gathered intelligence on it through informers, and led the early investigation, which later was handed over to James Vernon. There was no shortage of rumour, with the information from Thomas Prendergast proving decisive: he had been approached by George Porter on 13 February 1696, and then went to William Bentinck, 1st Earl of Portland, to reveal the conspiracy. In a second interview he gave the king details of the conspirators, a group numbering around 40 in all.

The ramifications of the plot proved more troublesome to Vernon. Fenwick defended himself actively by trying to implicate Lord Godolphin, the Duke of Shrewsbury, the Earl of Marlborough, and the Earl of Orford. These charges led into the heart of the Junto, and Shrewsbury was Vernon's immediate superior. To add to the awkward position, this group of Whigs had in fact been in correspondence with James II at St Germain.

Aftermath

The attempt did not take place on either day when the plotters were in position, and on 23 February 1696 a proclamation was made against them. A number of Jacobites connected to Fenwick, but not involved in the plot were arrested, including James Grahme on 3 March 1696, Thomas Higgons and Bevil Higgons; they were later released. On 21 March, Thomas Bruce, 2nd Earl of Ailesbury, another not directly involved in the plot was taken to the Tower of London, where he was kept until February 1697. Viscount Montgomery went into hiding after being named in a proclamation; he gave himself up on 15 December 1696 and was held in Newgate Prison for about seven months.

A long sequence of trials related to the plot began in March. The 1695 Treason Act made the date of arrest crucial in determining whether the accused were entitled to defense counsel; this was denied to Friend, Parkyns and Charnock when Sir John Holt enforced the letter of the law. Sentenced to death, Friend and Parkyns were attended by three Non-Juror priests (Jeremy Collier, Shadrach Cook and William Snatt) and immediately prior to the execution on 13 April 1696, the clergymen declared Friend and Parkyns absolved of their sins. In doing so, the clergymen effectively declared the conspirators to be correct in their actions, whilst also performing a rite that was not recognised by the Church of England. This caused a considerable furore; Collier went into hiding and was outlawed, while Cook and Snatt were tried and found guilty but later released.

Constantijn Huygens, William's personal secretary, records in his Diary; 'I was in doubt whether to watch the execution of Friend and Parkyns, but being on my way from Kensington, I saw the spectators walking away and so returned home.' He also mentions pamphlets on the trial were already for sale in the streets.

In addition to Friend and Parkyns, Rookwood and others, who had counsel, were executed in April 1696; in total, nine Jacobite activists were put to death. Sir John Fenwick was convicted on a bill of attainder, and executed on 28 January 1697. Robert Cassels, Robert Meldrum, James Counter, James Chambers, Robert Blackbourn, and Major John Bernardi were detained without trial; other than Counter, none were released, the last survivor, Bernardi, dying in 1736 while still in Newgate.

Political consequences
In political terms, the unmasked plot strengthened the hand of the Whig Junto in dealing with the Country Party, and in asking parliament to vote money. The House of Commons agreed to the swearing of an "association", in effect a loyalty oath to the king; and it was argued that William's preservation was divine providence, undermining the view that he had only been entitled to the English throne in the lifetime of the late Queen Mary.

Notes

1696 in England
Conspiracies
Failed assassination attempts in Europe
Jacobitism
1690s in London
17th-century coups d'état and coup attempts